Take It Easy with the Walker Brothers is the debut album by the American pop group the Walker Brothers. It is also commonly known as Take It Easy. The group's musical accompaniment was directed by Ivor Raymonde and produced by John Franz and Nick Venet. It was released in 1965 and reached number three on the UK Albums Chart. The album contains the group's first major hit single "Make It Easy on Yourself".  Receiving good to mixed reviews, the album was released in both Mono and Stereo LP formats in November 1965. The album was later released on CD having been  remastered and expanded in 1998. The sleeve notes were written by Brian Mulligan, the then press officer for Philips Records, with photography by Terence Donovan.

Introducing the Walker Brothers
In the USA the album was released on Smash Records as Introducing the Walker Brothers in December 1965. This alternate version shifted the running order around and replaced "Lonely Winds", "Girl I Lost in the Rain", "First Love Never Dies", and "Tell the Truth" with the singles "Love Her", "My Ship Is Coming In" and "Pretty Girls Everywhere", along with the last's B-side "Doin' the Jerk". The group can be seen miming "Doin' the Jerk" on the 1965 beach party movie Beach Ball.

Introducing the Walker Brothers is now out of print. In 2008 Water Records released the Philips Take It Easy track listing in the US for the first time.

Reception

Take It Easy with the Walker Brothers received good to mixed reviews from the majority of critics. Richie Unterberger writing retrospectively for Allmusic described the US version Introducing the Walker Brothers as "an erratic affair" that features "their trademark balladeering groove with the hits "Make It Easy On Yourself" and "My Ship Is Comin' In," but [sounding] stiff on uptempo R&B numbers like "Land of 1,000 Dances" and "Dancing in the Street"."

Track listing

Take It Easy (Philips Records)

Introducing The Walker Brothers (Smash Records)

Personnel
The Walker Brothers
Gary Walker - drums, vocals
John Walker - guitar, vocals
Scott Walker - vocals, guitar, keyboards
with:
The Quotations - accompaniment
Jack Nitzsche - arranger and conductor
Ivor Raymonde, Reg Guest - music director
John Franz - producer
Terence Donovan - photography

Charts

References

1965 debut albums
The Walker Brothers albums
Albums produced by Nick Venet
Philips Records albums
Albums produced by Johnny Franz
Albums conducted by Jack Nitszche
Albums arranged by Jack Nitzsche